Wahrenberg is a village and a former municipality in the district of Stendal, in Saxony-Anhalt, Germany. Since 1 September 2010, it has been part of the municipality of Aland. Wahrenberg has an area of 18 km².

References

Former municipalities in Saxony-Anhalt
Aland, Saxony-Anhalt